Chennai Super Kings (CSK) franchise cricket team based in Chennai, Tamil Nadu, India, plays in the Indian Premier League (IPL). They are one of the eight teams that competed in the 2018 Indian Premier League. It was revealed that Mahendra Singh Dhoni would lead the team for the ninth season in succession, while Michael Hussey is in his first season as the team's batting coach.

Kings retained their former skipper MS Dhoni, Suresh Raina and all rounder Ravindra Jadeja from their IPL 2015 squad for 33 crores before 2018 player auction.

The home matches of the Chennai Super Kings were under threat following the 2018 Cauvery water dispute and about 4000 security personnel were deployed in wake of the homecoming match for CSK against the Kolkata Knight Riders on April 10, 2018 at the M. A. Chidambaram Stadium. However later BCCI announced that Pune would be the new temporary home ground for CSK for the remainder of the tournament following the ongoing protests in the state which couldn't be controlled by the security officials.

In March 2019, a webseries titled Roar of The Lion (documentary) is set to be released based on CSK's epic success at the 2018 IPL where they managed to clinch the 2018 IPL trophy after serving a 2 year suspension.

IPL auction 2018

Chennai Super Kings bought the following players in the 2018 auction:*Kedar Jadhav

Squad
 Players with international caps are listed in bold.

Administration and support staff
 Owner – N. Srinivasan (India Cements)
 Head coach – Stephen Fleming
 Batting coach - Michael Hussey
 Bowling coach – Lakshmipathy Balaji
 Bowling consultant – Eric Simons
 Fielding coach – Rajiv Kumar
 Physical trainer – Gregory King
 Physio – Tommy Simsek
 Team Doctor – Dr.Madhu
 Team manager – Russell Radhakrishnan

Season overview

Standings

Results by match

Fixtures

League stage

Playoff stage

Qualifier 1

Final

Statistics

Most runs

 Source: Cricinfo

Most wickets

 Source: Cricinfo

References

Chennai Super Kings seasons